The 2020 WNBA Finals, officially WNBA Finals 2020 presented by YouTube TV for sponsorship reasons, was the best-of-five championship series for the 2020 season of the Women's National Basketball Association (WNBA).  The Finals feature the top seeded Las Vegas Aces facing off against the second seed Seattle Storm.  Despite losing both regular season meetings against Las Vegas, the Storm dominated the series, sweeping the Aces in three straight games.  Led by Finals MVP Breanna Stewart, Seattle won all three games by double-digits, claiming their second title in three years and fourth in franchise history.

Road to the Finals

Changes due to COVID-19 

The Finals were less affected than the regular season for the WNBA.  Format and seeding remained the same as it has in recent years.  However, the teams continued to play at the IMG Academy in Bradenton, Florida, thereby eliminating any home court advantages teams might have had in a normal playoffs.  Dates for the playoffs remained largely the same as a normal season.  No fans were allowed in the arena during the playoffs.

Standings

Playoffs

Summary

This finals was the fourth time in the five years since the WNBA switched playoff formats in 2016 that two teams from the same conference met in the WNBA Finals. In 2016 and 2017, two teams from the Western Conference met and in 2019 two teams from the Eastern Conference met.  This Finals is also the fourth time that the top two seeds have made it to the finals since the WNBA switched playoff formats in 2016. The lone non-top two seed to make the finals was the third seeded Washington Mystics in 2018.

The Las Vegas Aces qualified for the finals after finishing first in the regular season standings, which earned them a double-bye into the semifinals. In the semifinals, they defeated the Connecticut Sun in five games.

The Seattle Storm qualified for the finals after finishing second in the regular season standings, which earned them a double-bye into the semifinals. In the semifinals, they defeated the Minnesota Lynx in a three-game sweep.

The Aces won the regular season series 2–0.

Game 1

Game one started tense, with the first quarter finishing 23–21 in favor of the Storm.  The Storm extended their lead via a big second quarter, which they won by fifteen points.  Seattle took an eighteen point lead into halftime.  The Aces came out of halftime strong, winning the third quarter by fifteen points and cut the overall lead to three.  However, the Storm won the fourth quarter by eleven points to take the game by thirteen overall.  They take a one game lead in the best-of-five series.

The Storm were led by Breanna Stewart who recorded thirty seven points and fifteen rebounds.  Jewell Loyd also contributed 28 points.  Sue Bird set a WNBA Finals single game record for assists in a game with sixteen.  The Storm's bench contributed fifteen total points.  The Aces were led by Angel McCoughtry with twenty points.  A'ja Wilson added nineteen and three other players scored in double digits.  The Aces' bench scored sixteen points.

Game 2

Game two started with the Storm winning the first quarter by seven points.  The Aces made a small comeback and won the second quarter by one point.  Therefore, the Storm took a lead of six points into half time.  The Storm won the third quarter by a point and the fourth quarter by six points to win the game by thirteen points overall.  The Storm won the first two games by the same thirteen point margin to take a 2–0 lead in the series.

Five Storm players scored in double digits, including three who scored at least twenty points.  Breanna Stewart was the leading scorer with twenty-two points, and she was closely followed by Alysha Clark and Natasha Howard, who both scored twenty-one.  Jordin Canada also added ten from the bench.  Sue Bird recorded back-to-back double digit assist games, with sixteen in Game one and ten in this game.  The Aces had four total players score in double digits.  They were led by A'ja Wilson with twenty and both Angel McCoughtry and Emma Cannon scored seventeen.

Game 3
Similar to the first two games, game three started off close, with Seattle clinging to a 23-21 lead at the end of the first quarter.  However, the Storm dominated the rest of the way, outscoring the Aces 69-38 through the remaining 30 minutes.  The 33 point margin of victory was by far the most lopsided of the series after Seattle had won the first two games by 13 points each.

WNBA Finals MVP Breanna Stewart fittingly lead the Storm in points once again with 26.  Jewell Loyd added 19 points and a team-high 9 rebounds while Jordin Canada managed 15 points off the bench.  Alysha Clark and Natasha Howard each pulled down seven rebounds and combined for 15 points.  Sue Bird added seven assists on the way to her fourth WNBA title, all with the Storm.  A'ja Wilson led the Aces in scoring and passing with 18 points and four assists.  Jackie Young added 11 points for Las Vegas while Carolyn Swords led the Aces in rebounds with 10.

Team Rosters

References

External links
WNBA Playoffs Home

Women's National Basketball Association Finals
Finals
WNBA Finals
Seattle Storm
Las Vegas Aces
Basketball competitions in Florida
Women's sports in Florida
Sports in Bradenton, Florida